Bronica also Zenza Bronica was a Japanese manufacturer of classic medium-format roll film cameras and photographic equipment based in Tokyo, Japan. Their single-lens reflex (SLR) system-cameras competed with Pentax, Hasselblad, Mamiya and others in the medium-format camera market.

History
Before introduction of the first of what would become a dynasty of Zenza Bronica cameras in 1959, the Latinized Zenza Bronica name was already a popular Japanese luxury goods brand of the Shinkodo Works since 1947, specialized in the production of intricate crafted and decorated personal accessories, such as metal cigarette lighters and cases, cosmetic compacts, and watches, of diverse styles and designs.

The company's founder Zenzaburō Yoshino (in Japanese: , b. 25 January 1911 — d. 23 November 1988), wherefrom the Latinized Zenza Bronica brand name is derived, was the third son born into a Japanese rice merchant family. At an early age Yoshino showed deep reverence for the technical innovation and mechanics of world-renowned cameras produced by the likes of Leica, Contax and Rollei. Both fascinated and yet increasingly frustrated by the limitations of the cameras produced at that time period, where each camera's merits and demerits were not solved by just one camera, Yoshino visioned creating a high-precision interchangeable single-lens reflex camera modular system of his own design.

Yoshino's ambition, however, would require substantial investment, which he gradually self-funded from his family business in transportation and his passion for cameras by the establishment of a small camera store in Tokyo's Kanda district. Yoshino's camera store and his immense familiarity with deluxe foreign cameras became a huge success with photography enthusiasts in Japan, buying and selling luxury Leica and Contax cameras, which also gained popularity with US Army soldiers stationed in Japan after World War II. This formed the funding basis for his founding in 1947 of the Shinkodo Works with a vision of camera production, which at first produced Bronica brand luxury art deco accessories such as cigarette lighters and cases including watches, and positioned Bronica as a luxury brand in Japanese department stores, with popularity thriving among US Army soldiers in Japan.

The Shinkodo Works was Yoshino's precursor production base and funding source for what would later serve his Bronica camera and photographic equipment manufacturing; later consolidated under the Zenza Bronica Kogyo Kabushiki Kaisha (Zenza Bronica Industries, Inc) company. On 17 January 1952, the Shinkodo Works was directed by Yoshino to begin research and development of the Bronica prototype camera.

Film camera production
The prototype was a modular camera named the "Yoshino Flex". In June 1956 the Shinkodo Works created its first handmade example camera, and on reaching perfection in October 1958 with Yoshino's eighth prototype camera, the development costs had reached a sum of 200 million Yen, a huge sum at that time. The final prototype bore the Latinized nameplate "ZENZA BRONICA"—the Bronica Z (Zen-za) rollfilm camera—and first appeared at the Philadelphia Camera Show in March 1959, where it received ecstatic industry press coverage and left a deep lasting impression of being the world's dream camera. The Bronica Z modular camera system, shortly later with slight modifications renamed the Zenza Bronica D (Deluxe) and successor Bronicas, using large-coverage film format, high-quality Nikkor lenses supplied by the then Japan Optical Industries Co., Ltd., (Nikon Corporation) became instant successes in the deluxe camera market worldwide. The Bronica D was the Japanese answer and first serious challenger to the Swedish Hasselblad cameras, and in several technical ways outclassed the Swedish offerings. Such was the design success of Bronica, that in the United States it attracted influential figures from the photographic industry such as Burt Keppler who met with Yoshino. Bronica later introduced optics and lens units of its own manufacture incorporating Seiko shutters with its later camera designs and held a portfolio of international patents.

Acquisition and product discontinuation
Bronica was eventually acquired by the lens manufacturer Tamron Co., Ltd., in 1998 with emphasis on Bronica's optical lens manufacturing. In May 2000, Tamron introduced under the Bronica brand the RF645 rangefinder camera. Tamron discontinued the brand's single-lens reflex camera models (ETRSi, SQ-Ai, SQ-B and GS-1) between June 2002 and December 2004, sales having suffered from the lack of consideration to a digital camera back and loss of market share to digital photography and digital single-lens reflex (DSLR) cameras, particularly for the wedding and portrait photography business which had previously been a heavy user of medium-format photographic film but switched quickly to digital photography for its commercial workflow benefits. Bronica's last model, the RF645 rangefinder camera, was discontinued in September 2005, and marked the termination of the Bronica camera brand business.

Bronicas were workhorse photographic film cameras used by professional photographers for many years until the process of digital photography became widely adopted. Bronica cameras are, however, still widely used by photographers—both professional and advanced amateurs—whilst the commercial production of photographic 120 film remains available, in no small part due to superior image quality of 6x4.5, 6x6 and 6x7cm photographic film formats over smaller film (35mm) and digital image sensor formats.

JCII camera museum
The Japan Camera and Optical Instruments Inspection and Testing Institute (JCII) at its camera museum located in Ichibanchō district, central Tokyo, has a selection of Bronica camera models preserved among its museum display collections; as part of the museum's designation "preserving cameras considered of historical significance".

Bronica models
Bronica SLR system-cameras employed a modular design: The major components of the camera—lens, body, film-back and viewfinder were separate and interchangeable, providing options to match the specific photography or workflow needs of the photographer.

Classic models

From its start, Bronica introduced a number of 6x6 cm medium-format SLR cameras with focal plane shutter, which used Nikkor lenses from Nikon, until this line was discontinued with the introduction of the successor Bronica SQ-series. These models included:
 Bronica Z (Zen-za), debuted March 1959 at the Philadelphia Camera Show and renamed Bronica D (Deluxe) in December 1959 with slight modifications; production discontinued March 1961
 Bronica S (Standard), introduced April 1961; production discontinued April 1965
 Bronica C (Compact), introduced December 1964; production discontinued May 1965
 Bronica C2, introduced May 1965; production discontinued September 1972
 Bronica S2, introduced July 1965, S2A (introduced 1969), S2A type 2 (introduced 1972); production discontinued September 1977
 Bronica EC (Electrical Control), introduced April 1972; production discontinued December 1978
 Bronica EC-TL (Electrical Control with Through-the-Lens aperture priority automatic exposure), introduced June 1975, EC-TL II (introduced October 1978); production discontinued March 1980

Notably, the Bronica EC was the first medium-format SLR camera with an electrically operated focal plane shutter (Japan Patent No.: 43/94431 24 December 1968; US Patent No. US3696727), while the EC-TL was the first medium-format camera with Aperture priority automatic exposure (AE).

The range of Nikkor lenses for these remarkable cameras reached from 30mm (fisheye) to 1200mm and comprised about 30 lenses. Lens optics supplied by Carl Zeiss in Jena, Tokyo Optical Co., Ltd., Norita optics, Komura-Komuranon (Sankyo Kohki), Schneider Kreuznach, as well as lens optics later manufactured by Bronica itself (Zenzanon) based on designs by Zeiss and Japanese lens manufacturers were available, as well as a wide range of accessories, including different film magazines, bellows, and viewfinders.

ETR series

 ETR: Introduced March 1976, production discontinued March 1980. Advanced, compact, modular electronic 6x4.5 cm medium-format SLR camera system with a vast array of finders, film-backs, and other accessories. ETR was an acronym for Electronic, TTL-metering, Reflex. In 1977 the ETR received Japan's Good Design Award. Seventeen lenses with leaf shutters were made for the ETR-system from a fisheye, to four different zooms, to a 500mm super telephoto, to a unique 55mm tilt shift lens.
 ETR-C: Introduced November 1977, production discontinued December 1980. Identical to the ETR model except film magazine cannot be removed from film-back.
 ETRS: Introduced October 1978. Improved version of the ETR with an extra contact to support auto-exposure mode with the metered prism finder AE-II and later AE-III.
 ETRS: A modification introduced July 1982, ETRS production discontinued September 1989. Unnamed change to original ETRS model. Lens release sliding lever latch located to left side of camera side panel, film-backs released using two independent tabs. This version is reputedly referred to as the "plastic" body ETRS and film-back, for the change in the side panels of the body and film-backs to polycarbonate.
 ETRC: Introduced October 1978 (ETRC), production discontinued October 1980 (ETRC) Identical to the ETRS model except film magazine cannot be removed from film-back.
 ETRSi: Introduced December 1988, production discontinued December 2004. Improved version of the ETRS with mirror lock-up capability. Capable of through-the-lens off-the-filmplane (TTL-OTF) flash exposure. Significantly improved film-back design (Si) with locking darkslide.

SQ series

 SQ: Introduced August 1980 as replacement and successor to Bronica's classic and increasingly bulky Nikkor-lens based cameras, production discontinued September 1984. Modular 6x6 cm traditional "square film" medium-format SLR camera system with leaf shutter lenses.
 SQ-A: Introduced January 1982, production discontinued December 1991. The SQ-A was a refinement of the SQ. The contact pin array for the viewfinder was increased from six to ten gold contacts, allowing for auto metering capability with the AE finder S. Also, a mirror lock-up lever was added. The film-backs were modified slightly, with the ISO dial for the original film-backs having white and orange numerals, and the new with silver. The darkslide was changed to the locking style; to lock required both the new grey handle slide and the new silver numeral ISO dial back. All accessories for SQ cameras fit the SQ-A, however the AE finder cannot physically mount on the SQ; a safety defeat pin prevents attachment.
 SQ-Am: Introduced August 1982, production discontinued March 1991. Motorized film-advance only version of SQ-A body. Uses six additional AA batteries.
 SQ-Ai: Introduced December 1990, production discontinued December 2003. Added the following functionality to the SQ-A. Ability to add the motor drive SQ-i and off the film (TTL-OTF) metering with select flash guns. These changes required the addition of a circuit board which also required the battery compartment to be "flattened." The single 6v cell was replaced with four 1.5 volt "button" cells. A bulb 'B' setting was added to the shutter speed selector. The film-back was also modified again with the introduction of the SQ-Ai, relocating the ISO dial to the rear of the film-back (rather than on top) to allow the speed setting to be seen better with a prism attached. Exposure compensation control was also added to the new SQ-Ai film-back, with the ISO range extended to 6400.
 SQ-B (Basic): Introduced April 1996, production discontinued December 2003. The SQ-B was a manually operating SLR evolved from the SQ-Ai, built to primarily satisfy the needs of professional "studio" photographers who work with hand-held light meters, studio or portable flash equipment and various other accessories. Thus, motorized film-advance and through-the-lens metering (TTL) functionality were not present, as well as B (bulb exposure) and T (time exposure), as found on other SQ-series models. T (time exposure), however, was available when utilizing the appropriate SQ-series Zenzanon-S/PS lenses which incorporated the time (T) exposure lever function; by default the Zenzanon-PS/B 80mm f/2.8 lens which accompanied the SQ-B model did not include this feature. All SQ-series accessories and lenses were interchangeable with the SQ-B with few exceptions.

GS series
 GS-1: Introduced April 1983, production discontinued June 2002. Lightweight, electronically controlled, modular 6x7 cm medium-format SLR camera system with leaf shutter lenses, four interchangeable viewfinders, speed grip, and optional film-backs for Polaroid Land pack film, 6x4.5 cm, 6x6 cm, and 6x7 cm rollfilm. 120 and 220 size film-backs available in 6x4.5, 6x6 and 6x7 cm. A 35mm film-back was listed in the camera's marketing materials, but never materialized. Dedicated Flash (G1). The GS-1 uses "PG"-series lenses in a variety of focal lengths: 50mm, 65mm, 80mm, 100mm, 110mm macro, 150mm, 200mm, 250mm, and 500mm.

RF series
 RF645: Introduced May 2000, production discontinued September 2005. Extremely light and compact 6x4.5 cm film format coupled rangefinder camera system with four interchangeable leaf shutter lenses: 45mm, 65mm, 100mm and 135mm. The 135mm Tele Lens soon was discontinued due to calibration problems of the rangefinder-system. Dedicated flash (RF20) and special polarizer kit.

Further reading

References

External links

 American Actor Steve McQueen pictured using a Zenza Bronica S2: Historical photograph of American actor Steve McQueen pictured in 1966 using a Zenza Bronica S2 with magnifying hood on the set of American Western Nevada Smith, taken by celebrity photographer Chester Maydole (the Bronica S2 was part of Chester Maydole's camera arsenal).
 Bronica ETR-System Advertisement: Hotshoe magazine, 1979: Bronica advertisement with Playboy magazine Senior Vice President and Art Director Tom Staebler, Playboy magazine cover shots.

 
Photography companies of Japan
120 film cameras
Technology companies established in 1956
Cameras by brand
Japanese brands
1956 establishments in Japan